Usaviya Nihandai (Silence in the Courts) is a 2015 Sri Lankan Sinhala documentary dram directed by Prasanna Vithanage and produced by H D Premasiri.Specially this is not belongs to the film category. The film runs through narration, where the role leads by Thilakshini Ratnayake. Music composed by K (Indian composer). It is the 1261st Sri Lankan film in the Sinhala cinema.

Plot
The film is about true incident of infamous judge Lenin Ratnayake’s alleged sexual abuse, where incorrect decision given to a raped woman, who was initially failed to provide his innocence at the court. Film was screened at many international film festivals, prior to screen at Sri Lanka.

Cast
 Thilakshini Ratnayake as K.M.B Kamalawathi
 Vibhishana Kurera as Chandana Pushparuwan
 Chula Mendis as Lenin Rathnayake
 Anton Kurera as Lawyer Tennakoon
 Chinthaka Vas as Bulathsinhalage Abeysinghe

References

External links
 
 

2015 films
2010s Sinhala-language films
Films directed by Prasanna Vithanage